"Agenda Suicide" is the first single released from the album, Danse Macabre by The Faint. It was released only in the UK, February 26, 2002, on City Slang.  The song is about overwork of people, to get "pretty little homes". The song was covered by Cancer Bats and released on their split with Rolo Tomassi in April 2009.

Music video
The music video, by animation studio MK12, shows bosses bullying employees, while they continue to work.  It includes one employee who takes pills with coffee in the beginning of the day.  Throughout the video it shows people in business suits throwing themselves in front of subway trains.  At the end of the video, the main character throws himself into the path of a train, while others look down into the track where he jumped.

The music video was banned from MTV because it showed people jumping in front of trains to kill themselves, though it has on occasion been shown as a part of 120 Minutes which is broadcast post-watershed.

Track listing
 "Agenda Suicide (album version)"
 "Agenda Suicide (club mix)"
 "Falling Out Of Love At This Volume (Bright Eyes cover)"
+video

External links
The Faint official website
Saddle Creek Records

2002 singles
The Faint songs
2001 songs